The Ruixing M90 is a MPV produced by Changan Automobile under the Ruixing sub-brand.

Overview
The Ruixing M90 debuted in the 2016 and was launched on the Chinese auto market with prices ranging from 68,500 yuan to 92,500 yuan at launch. 

The Ruixing M90 is available in 4-seater, a 6-seater, a 7-seater, and a 9-seater configurations. The power of the Ruixing M90 comes from a Mitsubishi-sourced 4G94S 2.0 liter four-cylinder petrol engine producing 122hp and 166nm of torque.

The Ruixing M90 is manufactured by Chana, Changan’s commercial division, also later known as Oushang. As of 2019, the Ruixing van products has been excluded from Oushang's official website and was sold separately from a different channel under the Kaicene brand.

Ruixing M70
The Ruixing M70 is essentially the shorter version of the Ruixing M90 MPV.

References

External links

Changan Official website 

Ruixing M90
Minivans
Front-wheel-drive vehicles
Cars of China
Cars introduced in 2016